Jack Barton may refer to:

 Jack Barton, English rugby league player
 Jack Barton (footballer, born 1895) (1895–1962), English footballer for Blackburn Rovers and Rochdale

See also
 John Barton (disambiguation)